World Series Cricket (WSC) was a break away professional cricket competition staged between 1977 and 1979.

Formed by Australian business man Kerry Packer following the refusal of the Australian Cricket Board (ACB)  to accept the bid of Packer's Channel Nine to gain exclusive television rights to Australia's Test matches, World Series Cricket involved matches between WSC Australia XI, WSC World XI and WSC West Indies. The teams included leading Australian, English, Pakistani, South African and West Indian players, most notably England captain Tony Greig, West Indies captain Clive Lloyd, Australian captain Greg Chappell and former Australian captain Ian Chappell.

The teams played five day "Supertests" and one day "International Cup" matches in Australia and the West Indies. The first WSC game, a Supertest between the Australians and the West Indians, began at VFL Park on 2 December 1977.

Sixteen Supertest five wicket hauls were by players from all three of the WSC teams. The first of these was by Greg Chappell on 1 January 1978. Dennis Lillee's seven wickets for twenty three runs (7/23) was the best bowling figures in World Series Cricket and Lillee also holds the record for most Supertest five wicket hauls with four.

Eight International Cup five wicket hauls were taken during World Series Cricket, with Andy Roberts claiming the first on 3 February 1978. No player took more than one five wicket haul and WSC World XI player Garth Le Roux returned the best figures with five wickets for six runs, against WSC Australia XI.

Key
Date – Date the fifth wicket was taken.
Inn – The innings of the match in which the five-wicket haul was taken.
Overs – Number of overs bowled in that innings.
* - Overs consisting of eight deliveries.
Runs – Runs conceded.
Wkts – Number of wickets taken.
Batsmen – The batsmen whose wickets were taken in the five-wicket haul.
Result – The result for the player's team in that match.

Supertest five wicket hauls

International Cup five wicket hauls

See also

List of World Series Cricket international centuries

References

Five-wicket hauls
World Series